Jean-Francois Campos (born in Aix-en-Provence, France) is a French photographer. His work has been exhibited internationally in numerous galleries and museums, such as the International Center of Photography in New York as well as the Centre national de la photographie in Paris. After an esteemed career as an Agence Vu photojournalist, beginning in Berlin during the fall of the Berlin wall, and a long term collaboration with the French daily newspaper Libération, Jean-Francois Campos turned to fashion and portrait photography in 2006.  Jean-Francois has since created numerous award-winning campaigns for clients such as  Dior,  Louis Vuitton, Shiseido, Celine, Van Cleef & Arpels, and LVMH; and has directed commercials for the likes of Secours Populaire, Mobalpa, and Links of London.  Jean-François has collaborated to many international publications such as ELLE Magazine, Town & Country Magazine, Le Monde, and V Magazine.

Awards
2014   Winner of American Photography 30 in the Editorial Portraiture category for portrait of Mary Ann Schoettly, an ordained priest
2012: Corporate Award at 27th Grand Prix de la Publicité Presse Magazine for LVMH; "Les Journées Particulières"
2004:  1st Prize Club des AD for Sony PlayStation campaign
1997: HSBC Foundation for Photography winner
1997: Nominated for the AFP award
1997: Laureate World Press Photo Masterclass
1996: Prix Moins Trente from the :fr:Centre National de la Photographie
1991: Laureate of the Biennale des Jeunes Createurs de l’Europe de la Mediterranee
1990: Laureate of the Fondation Angenieux

Exhibitions
2009: Sara, just Sara : in the mirror of my myths – Milk Gallery, New York
2006: Comment ça va avec l’amour – Maison de la Villette, Paris
2001: Le Collectif HSBC – Paris Photo, Paris
1999: Le Collectif Vu - Paris
1990: Berlin, à Coeur Ouvert – FNAC Galeries in Marseille, Bordeaux, Strasbourg, Paris, Berlin
1998: The French President - Mois de la Photo, Moscow
1997: Après la Pluie – Galerie Beaudoin Lebon, Paris
1997: Neighbours – Netherlands Institute for Photography, Rotterdam
1996: New Photography from France - International Center of Photography, New York
1996: Politique et Société – Centre National de la Photographie, Paris
1995:  La Solitude du Candidat Chirac – Festival Visa pour l’Image, Perpignan
1991: Souvenirs de Berlin – Nuit de la photo, Musée de l'Élysée, Lausanne
1991: Fragments - Musée de la Vieille Charité,  Marseille

Monographs
Campos' first monograph   Après la Pluie (Actes Sud Editions) was published in 1997 as a retrospection of his work in the French newspaper Libération with a preface by Jean Rouaud.  Following this, Campos published Je ne vois pas ce qu’on me trouve (Actes Sud Collection Cinéma et Photographie, 1997) - a collection of images shot during the backstage moments of Christian Vincent's film which bears the same title, postface by Christian Caujolle.

Publications
Unbalanced (Self-published, 2014) 
Sara, just Sara (Miedzy Nami Cafe, Issue #28, 2009)
Photographies Contemporaines (Textuel, 2006) 
Je ne vois pas ce qu'on me trouve (Actes Sud Collection Cinema et Photographie, 1997) 
Apres la Pluie (Actes Sud Monographie, 1997)

References

External links

20th Anniversary Prix HSBC pour la Photographie : Jean-Francois Campos, 1997 Winner

Living people
French photographers
People from Aix-en-Provence
Year of birth missing (living people)